Žrnovnica is a river in Croatia that springs at the foot of the Mosor, near Dvori village, in Split municipality, and in its short course flows through Žrnovnica and Podstrana settlements, in the wider area of city of Split, in the Split-Dalmatia County. The total length of the river is 4,800 meters. Its basin is a direct Adriatic Sea watershed.

Course and features 
Žrnovnica is a karst river, and in its upper course, is classified mountain river with very clear and cold waters, faster flow with small rapids and waterfalls. It flows through the place of the same name, Žrnovnica, and flows into the Adriatic only a few kilometers from Split in the direction of Omiš.

In its upper course, Žrnovnica passes through a nearly inaccessible gorge, making it the best preserved part of the river. A promenade was made along the lower part of the river bank, and the rest of the bank was overgrown with willows and figs with other aquatic and riparian vegetation.

In the upper course, the river is inhabited by highly endangered endemic salmonid species, so called Softmouth trout, also known as Adriatic trout (Salmothymus obtusirostris salonitana), while the lower course has healthy populations of Rainbow trout and eel, and some Brown trout.

The softmouth trout is a special feature of the Žrnovnica river. It was introduced from nearby Jadro river, and it is one of a handful of rivers in Adriatic watershed, along with Jadro, to hosts this endangered endemic salmonid species, others being Vrljika, Neretva, Zeta and Morača.

References

External links 

 Visit Podstrana - Rijeka Žrnovnica

Drainage basins of the Adriatic Sea
Rivers of Croatia
Split-Dalmatia County